General Hartley may refer to:

Alan Hartley (1882–1954), British Indian Army general
Harold Hartley (chemist) (1878–1972), British Army brigadier general
James Hartley (East India Company officer) (1745–1799), East India Company major general
John Hartley (general) (born 1943), Australian Army major general